Ras al-Ayn (Arabic: رأس العين) is a Syrian village in the Qatana District of the Rif Dimashq Governorate. According to the Syria Central Bureau of Statistics (CBS), Ras al-Ayn had a population of 892 in the 2004 census.

References

External links

Populated places in Qatana District